Ninie Doniah is a Malagasy singer and composer of salegy music that originates from the northern coastal area of Madagascar, including her birthplace of Nosy Be. She descends from a musical family: her grandmother was a celebrated singer of the traditional jijy vako-drazana antakarana.

Doniah is commonly termed the "Queen of Salegy", in counterpoint to the "King of Salegy," superstar Jaojoby. She is considered one of the best female salegy performers in a genre dominated by men, and is the most well-recognized and successful female ambassadors of the genre outside of Madagascar. She has recorded more than six albums since the mid-1990s and continues to tour throughout Madagascar and the Indian Ocean islands.

See also
Music of Madagascar

Notes

References
 

21st-century Malagasy women singers
20th-century Malagasy women singers